Friedrich von Roehm, also known as the Black Rook, is a fictional supervillain appearing in American comic books published by Marvel Comics. The character is usually depicted as an adversary of the X-Men.

Von Roehm possesses a hereditary ability that is likened to lycanthropy. Von Roehm undergoes a transformation from his ordinary human form through a process mentally activated by Selene. He attained the rank of "Black Rook," of the Lords Cardinal of the New York branch of the Hellfire Club, an exclusive secret society bent on world domination. In civilian life, he was a jeweler.

Publication history
Created by writer Chris Claremont and artist Bill Sienkiewicz, the Black Rook first appeared in New Mutants #22 (December 1984).

The character subsequently appears in The Uncanny X-Men #189 (January 1985), and #208 - 209 (August - September 1986), in which he dies.

Fictional character biography
Apparentally German by birth, Friedrich von Roehm operated a jewelry shop on New York City's Park Avenue. Von Roehm was also secretly a lycanthrope and a high priest of the supernatural being and self-described goddess Selene. Von Roehm, who had worshipped Selene as a goddess, became her personal servant when she showed up in his jewelry shop.

As a member of the Hellfire Club, von Roehm sponsored Selene for membership. Selene became the new Black Queen, and von Roehm served as the Black Rook. Alongside the Hellfire Club, he later battled the X-Men in New York's Central Park. Selene used powers to mentally trigger von Roehm's hereditary lycanthropy and sent him in pursuit of Rachel Summers. When Nimrod intervened to attack the X-Men and the Club, Storm proposed an alliance to battle Nimrod. Von Roehm rejected this proposal and attempted to attack the X-Men, but was disintegrated by Nimrod.

Powers and abilities
Von Roehm possessed a power likened to lycanthropy. Von Roehm did not undergo the typical change in appearance associated with werewolves. However, he acquired superhuman strength, enhanced senses, claws, and barely controllable bloodlust during his transformation. His powers were genetically based, but required mental triggering by Selene. Aside from his personal devotion to Selene, von Roehm was apparentally mentally compelled to obey Selene while in his superhuman state.

Other media
Friedrich Von Roehm, among other Hellfire Club members, was originally planned to appear in Dark Phoenix, but was ultimately cut from the film.

References

External links
 

Characters created by Bill Sienkiewicz
Characters created by Chris Claremont
Comics characters introduced in 1984
Fictional businesspeople
Fictional characters with superhuman senses
Fictional werewolves
Marvel Comics characters who are shapeshifters
Marvel Comics characters with superhuman strength
Marvel Comics male supervillains
Marvel Comics mutates